Olivia Gadecki and Rebeka Masarova were the defending champions but chose not to participate.

Maria Bondarenko and Ioana Loredana Roșca won the title, defeating Isabelle Haverlag and Justina Mikulskytė in the final, 4–6, 6–4, [11–9].

Seeds

Draw

Draw

References

External Links
Main Draw

Open Araba en Femenino - Doubles